The 2016–17 Richmond Spiders women's basketball team represented the University of Richmond during the 2016–17 NCAA Division I women's basketball season. The Spiders, led by 12th year head coach Michael Shafer, played their home games at the Robins Center and were members of the Atlantic 10 Conference. They finished the season 13–17, 7–9 in A-10 play to finish in ninth place. They lost in the first round of the A-10 women's tournament to VCU.

2016–17 media
All Spiders games are broadcast on WTVR 6.3 with Robert Fish on the call. The games are also streamed on Spider TV .

Roster

Schedule

|-
!colspan=9 style="background:#000066; color:#FFFFFF;"| Non-conference regular season

|-
!colspan=9 style="background:#000066; color:#FFFFFF;"| Atlantic 10 regular Season

|-
!colspan=9 style="background:#000066; color:#990000;"| Atlantic 10 Tournament

Rankings
2016–17 NCAA Division I women's basketball rankings

See also
 2016–17 Richmond Spiders men's basketball team

References

Richmond Spiders women's basketball seasons
Richmond
Richmond Spiders women's basketball
Richmond
Spiders basketball, women
Spiders basketball, women